71st parallel may refer to:

71st parallel north, a circle of latitude in the Northern Hemisphere
71st parallel south, a circle of latitude in the Southern Hemisphere